Quiches District is one of ten districts of the Sihuas Province in the Ancash Region of northern Peru.

References

States and territories established in 1914
Districts of the Sihuas Province
Districts of the Ancash Region